The Fayoum Light Railway (FLR) was a  gauge Egyptian light railway.  Founded by a group of Egyptian Coptic investors, it operated in the first half of the twentieth century.

Construction 

Construction began in 1898. The railway served an irrigation district south of Cairo, centred on the provincial capital of Medinet-el-Fayoum. British railway engineer Everard Calthrop was a consultant on this railway.

Operation 
The railway was mainly used for transporting sugar cane and other agricultural produce, but it also transported passengers. In 1904 a total of 618,000 passengers and 145,000 tons of goods were carried.

The Government Inspector reported in 1904 very unfavourably on the Fayoum Company, which was managed for the first five years after its incorporation by S. Sandison de Bilinski. The railway was apparently in need of a competent manager. "The Staff" the inspector wrote, "appear to be entirely out of hand, and the Traffic and Locomotive Departments have both apparently been left to run by themselves."

In 1936, the company owned 17 locomotives, 2 railcars, 52 coaches and 248 goods wagons.

Fossils 

The American vertebrate paleontologist Walter Granger used the railway in April 1907 during his expedition, which was sponsored by the American Museum of Natural History in New York for transporting the fossils that he had found from Tamieh (Tamia) to Cairo.

Anthrosol 

The railway tracks were probably also used by a company that harvested a rich anthrosol, locally called sibakh, which consists of decomposed organic debris, left by the ancient Egyptians. The workers, who dug pits for removing the soil, found well preserved papyri, which were sold to collectors and museums. This caused some interest by archeologists, who closed a deal with the Italian managers of the company that sold the compost, by which the team of the archeologists had to dig-out a sufficient amount of compost to keep the company and their rail vehicles busy, while they were searching for the papyri from 1928 to 1935.

Takeover and continuing use 

The majority of the shares in the Fayoum company (80%) was transferred in 1906 to the Anglo-Belgian Company of Egypt, which had been organized in the same year in London for this purpose. It also owned some properties in the centre of Cairo, for instance the garden of the Ghezireh Palace Hotel and the ground of the French Institute.  Baron Georges de Reuter became the first president of the company. He was a relative of Baron Paul Julius von Reuter, the founder of the news agency Reuters Telegraphic Co.

Joseph Kfoury, who owned and operated already some coach lines in the Fayoum province, acquired a significant part of the shares of the Fayoum Light Railways Company in 1939, and was nominated to be its manager. Its headquarters were located in the al-Immobilia building at this time.

Some of the stock exchange certificates were re-issued on 1 May 1944, which demonstrates that the company still existed during World War II, although no time tables for passenger transport had been issued since 1938. After the war, operations ceased, although the government's concession would have been valid for 70 years, i.e., up to 1972.

Lines and stations 

130. FAYUM – GHARAQ 

Fayum
Shaikh Hassan
Abgig
Barmaki
Massara
Sawafna 
Difino 
Etsa
Guaafra
Miniet-el-Heit
Shidmoh 
Abou Nour
Danial 
Gharaq

131. MINIET-EL-HEID – SHAWASHNA 

Miniet-el-Heit (see 130)
Nawara
Abou-Guandir
El-Wanaissa
Mokhtalata
Abou-Hamach 
Nezlet-Balad  
Kasr-el-Guibali
Gebel Saad
Shawashna

132. FAYUM — AGAMIYNE/NEZLEH-WADI 

Fayum (see 130)
Shaikh Hassan (see 130) 
Soufi
Abou Eche  
Omar Bey  
Aly Bey
Manchat—Halfa
Hereit
Georges Eid a Guaradu
Tobhar 
→ Nezleh-Wadi a Agamiyne (branch)
Agamiine
Abou-Hanach

133. FAYUM — QALAMSHA 

Fayum (see 130) 
Sheikh Hassan (see 128)
Maghraby 
→ Deir-el-Azzab (branch)
Azab
Ezbet Qalamsha
Ezbet Mattar
Qalamsha

134. FAYUM — LAHUN 

Fayum (see 130) 
Quhafa
Guinedi
Rushdi 
Khaled Bey
Hawara
Bahr-Seila
Dimishkine (Minshat Kamal)
Bash-Kateb 
Lahun

135. FAYUM — RODAH 

Fayum (see 130) 
Massloub
Edwa 
Mittertaris (Matar Taris)
Ekhssas
Massaret-Douda
Kafr Mahfouz
Tamieh (terminus)
Rodah (via 137)

136. MASSARET-DOUDA — SENNORES 

Massaret-Douda (see 135)
Guabala
Sennorés

137. MITTERTARIS — RODAH 

Mittertaris (see 135) 
Kafr-Koleib
Sersina 
Forkos
Rodah (see 135)

External links 
 Railway Stations List

References 

Railway companies of Egypt
750 mm gauge railways in Egypt
Railway lines in Egypt